5th Gear may refer to:
Fifth Gear, a British television show formerly known as "5th Gear"
5th Gear (album), an album by Brad Paisley
5th Gear (video game), a video game for the Commodore 64

See also
Transmission (mechanics), for the fifth gear in mechanics